The 1960 USAC Championship Car season consisted of 12 races, beginning in Trenton, New Jersey on April 10 and concluding in Phoenix, Arizona on November 20. There were also two non-championship events at Langhorne, Pennsylvania, and Pikes Peak, Colorado.  This was the final year that the Indianapolis 500 was a part of the Formula One World Championship.  The USAC National Champion was A. J. Foyt and the Indianapolis 500 winner was Jim Rathmann. Three time USAC/AAA National Champion (1954, 1956, 1957), and 1958 Indianapolis 500 winner Jimmy Bryan, was killed in an accident during the Langhorne 100 at Langhorne Speedway; he was 34 years old.

Schedule and results

 Indianapolis 500 was USAC-sanctioned and counted towards the 1960 FIA World Championship of Drivers title.
 No pole is awarded for the Pikes Peak Hill Climb, in this schedule on the pole is the driver who started first. No lap led was awarded for the Pikes Peak Hill Climb, however, a lap was awarded to the drivers that completed the climb.

Final points standings

References
 
 
 http://media.indycar.com/pdf/2011/IICS_2011_Historical_Record_Book_INT6.pdf  (p. 274-275)

See also
 1960 Indianapolis 500

1960 in motorsport
1960
1960 in American motorsport